Walnut Grove was a small town (now extinct) in Prairie Township, Warren County, Indiana, located three miles east of Tab.  A 1913 history describes the town's population as about 50.

History

A post office was once established at Walnut Grove in 1872, and remained in operation until it was discontinued in 1900.

Geography
Walnut Grove is located in flat, open farmland at the intersection of County Roads 650 North and 500 West.

References

 Clifton, Thomas A. (editor) (1913), Past and Present of Fountain and Warren Counties, Indiana, Indianapolis: B. F. Bowen & Co.

Former populated places in Warren County, Indiana
Former populated places in Indiana